The February 2009 North American storm complex occurred on February 10 and February 11, 2009, affecting portions of both the Central and Eastern United States. During the two-day period, 15 tornadoes touched down in seven states. Oklahoma was struck by six tornadoes, the most of any state. The six tornadoes in Oklahoma also tied the record for the most tornadoes ever recorded in the state during the month of February (six tornadoes also touched down in Oklahoma in February of 1975); the record was broken in 2023. The first day of the outbreak produced the most tornadoes; the second brought mainly high wind damage and rain or snow in most of the Northeast.

The storm system responsible for the tornado outbreak resulted from the unusual congruence of a cold, dry system, originating in the Four Corners and a warm, moist system, moving north out of Texas. Complicating factors included daytime heating and a strong wind field favorable to the creation of circulating thunderstorms. On the second day, the stronger cold front limited discrete supercell activity and the risk of tornadoes decreased significantly. A squall line, however, produced high winds and rain along the river valleys, primarily those of the Mississippi and Ohio Rivers. This squall line continued to renew its energy as it passed through the Midwest, Pennsylvania, New Jersey, New York, and New England, causing wind and water damage, and dumping  of snow in central and eastern Massachusetts. The resulting power outages affected homes throughout the northeastern seaboard.

The most destructive of the weather events, a long-track EF4 tornado, traveled for nearly an hour through four counties in Texas and Oklahoma during the evening of February 10. It destroyed 114 residences in Lone Grove alone. Almost all of the casualties (8 deaths and 46 injuries) from the outbreak were due to the tornado in the Lone Grove area in Carter County. It was the deadliest tornado to hit Oklahoma since May 3, 1999 and the strongest tornado during the month of February in Oklahoma since 1950.

Meteorological synopsis

February 10

During the afternoon hours of February 10, 2009, a strong, middle and upper storm system moved across the Four Corners region into the central and southern Great Plains. A moist, low-level air mass streamed northward across Texas and Louisiana into eastern Oklahoma and the Ozarks ahead of the system. Daytime heating of the moistening boundary layer increased throughout the afternoon across Oklahoma and Texas as cloud cover shifted eastward. Cooling aloft, in conjunction with the approaching storm system, led to atmospheric instability, resulting in thunderstorms. A very strong wind field increased with height through the lower troposphere, resulting in a wind shear favorable for rotation in the thunderstorms.

Meteorologists expected large hail stones and damaging winds, and recognized the potential for strong tornadoes as thunderstorms developed from central Oklahoma southward into north-central Texas in the afternoon. During the night, a cold front moved eastward toward the Mississippi Valley and organized the thunderstorms into a lengthy squall line. Along with a continued threat of hail and tornadoes, the risk of damaging winds increased. The Storm Prediction Center announced a "moderate risk" of severe weather for portions of eastern Oklahoma, northeastern Texas, western Arkansas, and northwestern Louisiana.

At around 1:00 pm CST (19:00 UTC), a line of violent thunderstorms began developing near the Wichita Mountains in Comanche County, Oklahoma. The supercell that eventually produced the first tornado of the outbreak moved northeast through Caddo and Grady counties over the next 30 to 45 minutes, before reaching southeastern Canadian County at around 2:00 pm CST (20:00 UTC). By 2:14 pm CST (20:14 UTC), the line had formed a hook echo, which was fully developed four minutes later. Observers reported wall clouds from the Yukon area into western portions of Oklahoma City during the next 10 to 15 minutes. At 2:36 pm CST (20:37 UTC), the supercell produced a tornado near the Wiley Post Airport in Oklahoma City, causing damage at the Northwest Expressway. According to the Doppler weather radar, the hook continued to show signs of rotation as it moved northeast across Oklahoma County. At 2:52 pm CST (20:52 UTC), the supercell produced its second tornado on the northwestern side of Edmond which caused its most severe damage near the Oklahoma and Logan County line. The tornado dissipated north of the Logan County Line at 3:05 pm CST (21:05 UTC).

The supercell produced three more tornadoes in Oklahoma as it continued to move northeast. The third tornado occurred northwest of Meridian in Logan County at 3:26 pm CST (21:36 UTC). The fifth tornado occurred in Pawnee County. In addition to the five Oklahoma tornadoes, three tornadoes struck northern sections of Texas and one tornado hit Springfield, Missouri.

The most significant tornado, later named the Lone Grove Tornado, first touched down in Northern Montague County, Texas at 6:45 pm CST (00:48 UTC) near the Red River. The tornado moved through rural areas as it crossed the Red River into southern Oklahoma, before going into Carter County at 7:10 pm CST (01:10 UTC). The tornado continued moving to the northeast for the next 15 minutes before striking Lone Grove, Oklahoma. The tornado then crossed I-35 just north of the Prairie Valley Road exit ramp and tracked through rural areas of northeastern Carter County to the east of Springer, ending at 7:43 pm CST (01:43 UTC).

February 11
The Storm Prediction Center issued a slight risk warning for February 11. The warning included parts of the Deep South, Ohio Valley, Midwest, and Appalachians. The risk of tornadoes was lower on February 11 due to a stronger front, which limited discrete supercell activity and decreased atmospheric instability. The "slight risk" was later upgraded to a "moderate risk" as a powerful squall line developed.

Confirmed tornadoes

February 10 event

February 11 event

Edmond, Oklahoma

The tornado traveled towards the northeast, crossing into Logan County and dissipating at 3:05 pm CST (21:05 UTC). Most of the downtown residences were left without power after the tornado struck the area around 2:59 pm CST (20:59 UTC). Ten minutes earlier, tornado sirens were sounded as a tornado warning was issued for the area. Students who were being taken home by bus at the time were immediately taken to the nearest school for shelter. The schools were placed in lockdown for about two hours following the tornado sirens. In Edmond, six homes were destroyed, eight structures received major damage, 51 received minor damage and another 166 structures were affected. Some of the homes damaged by the tornado were estimated to be worth over $1 million. The Oak Tree Golf Club sustained severe damage, with numerous trees being uprooted. Hundreds of trees were uprooted or significantly damaged along the tornado's path. In Oklahoma County, the tornado left an estimated 28,500 people without power. Monetary damage numbers were not available.

Lone Grove, Oklahoma

At 6:45 pm CST (00:48 UTC), a large, violent wedge tornado – a tornado that is wider than the distance from ground to cloud base – touched down near the Red River, along the Texas-Oklahoma border. It crossed through Jefferson and Love counties before entering Carter County where it proceeded to slam into Lone Grove. The tornado dissipated at 7:43 pm CST (01:43 UTC) after remaining on the ground for nearly an hour and traveling an estimated . After an assessment by the National Weather Service office in Norman, Oklahoma, the tornado was rated EF4 on the Enhanced Fujita Scale with winds reaching an estimated .

The Lone Grove tornado was the deadliest to strike Oklahoma since May 3, 1999, and the strongest tornado during the month of February in Oklahoma since 1950. The previous strongest were two F3 tornadoes which touched down on February 17, 1961.

In Lone Grove alone, buildings were thrown off their slabs and the local chamber of commerce office was flattened. The tornado destroyed a furniture store, and shattered the glass lobby of the local UPS building. The destruction of a mobile home park containing 40 homes left close to 100 people homeless. One mobile home was thrown  from its foundation. A total of 114 residences were destroyed in Lone Grove.

To the east of Lone Grove, the area north of Ardmore was also hard hit. Several buildings, including those of the Beaver Academy and the Ardmore Adventist Academy, were destroyed. Although damage centered on the Ardmore Academy gymnasium, most of the campus was considered a total loss. In Ardmore, eight homes were destroyed and another 20 sustained damage.

Eight people were confirmed dead as a result of the tornado. Seven of these fatalities were in the town of Lone Grove; most were determined to have been caused by "blunt-force trauma to the head". Three of the victims were found inside their homes and two were found outside. A victim found in an open field was reportedly picked up and thrown by the tornado, and died on impact with the ground. One victim was crushed when a pickup truck fell on him; similarly, a truck driver died after being pinned under his vehicle on I-35. Two other victims, the parents of a 13-year-old girl, were killed when the tornado picked the three of them out of their home and threw them . Three people were rescued after being trapped in the ruins of their home for almost a day. Officials stated that 10 to 15 people remained unaccounted for on the night of February 12 but they were presumed to have left the area. An additional 46 people were injured. Total monetary damages from the tornado were estimated at $3 million.

Non-tornadic events

During the evening of February 10, a long line of severe thunderstorms developed along the tail-end of a cold front in central Texas. North of the squall line, bow echo thunderstorms developed in Missouri, causing widespread wind damage. Around 12 pm EST (17:00 UTC), the first line of thunderstorms significantly weakened, but a new, narrow line developed in eastern Kentucky and Tennessee. A strong, deep layer wind field prevented a number of tornadoes from forming but instead caused widespread wind damage. Throughout the day, the line of low-topped thunderstorms continued eastward, reaching Ohio and West Virginia by 4 pm EST (21:00 UTC). Several hours later, the line broke apart, with the strongest storms tracking through Pennsylvania.

Oklahoma
In addition to the strong tornadoes, Oklahoma was affected by high winds and large hail. Numerous cars were hit and several houses sustained roof damage; the cost of the hail damage was estimated at $100,000 in the town. Heavy rains produced by the storms also caused isolated flooding, inundating numerous streets with several feet of water. Lightning also produced damage in the state, with one bolt striking an oil tank, igniting a fire. The fire severely damaged the tank, leaving $13,000 in damages. Throughout the state, an estimated 61,000 people lost power: 29,000 lost power due to thunderstorms  and 32,000 due to tornadoes. In Mississippi, strong winds on the backside of the cold front blew a metal roof off a power company building, bringing down several trees and power lines. Damages in the state amounted to $35,000.

Texas

Strong straight-line winds near  caused significant damage in Hamilton County, Texas. A trailer near Hamilton Municipal Airport was broken off its moorings and moved . Several mobile homes near Hamilton sustained damage after tree limbs fell on them. In Huron, several outbuildings were damaged or destroyed and a permanent building was damaged at a youth retreat center. An estimated 15,000 residences were without power following the storms in Texas. One home in McGregor was destroyed by the winds. The three people who lived in the home, one of whom was a child, all sustained injuries. The father had a few broken ribs and several scratches, injuries sustained during a search for his son. In Louisiana, 12,000 residences lost power due to the storm system. Two wildfires were sparked in Kenedy County and Kleberg County, burning  respectively. The larger of the two fires was along SH 77. The second fire burned three homes and threatened 20 others.

Arkansas
In Arkansas, high winds produced by the squall line knocked out power to 315,324 residences and caused widespread structural damage. Trees and power lines were brought down in eight counties, and several homes in Independence and Van Buren County sustained damage. An  wind gust in Van Buren blew a barn onto AR 9. Hundreds of trees were blown down, many of which fell on homes, causing widespread damage which amounted to approximately $625,000. In Conway County, a sawmill and two barns were destroyed, while several homes and a church also sustained damage, mainly roof damage. Damages in the county were estimated at $300,000. Numerous homes sustained wind damage and two mobile homes and a recreational vehicle were overturned. Damages in the county were estimated at $750,000. Total damages throughout the state were estimated at $2.4 million. Seven people sustained injuries in the state.

Ohio
In Ohio,  wind gusts led to a highway accident that killed a truck driver. The high winds also caused significant damage throughout the state. Heavy rains produced by the same system inundated several streets in flood-prone towns in Ohio. In Scioto County, the high winds destroyed a brick house and brought down power lines. The most significant damage resulted from the strong pressure gradient behind the frontal system. Ten railroad cars were knocked off their tracks near Shelby. Several hundred homes lost shingles and gutters due to the winds. Wind also overturned two semi-trailers, though the drivers of both vehicles were unharmed. A vacant school building in Epworth lost its entire roof. Some windows were damaged or broken by flying debris or fallen trees. Power outages forced numerous schools to close for at least two days following the storm. A large barn was leveled just north of Brighton in Lorain County by  winds. Throughout the state, damages from the storm system amounted to $4.7 million.

Alabama, Missouri, Kentucky, Tennessee and Michigan

In Missouri, high winds caused widespread damage and knocked out power to 7,629 residences. Several homes and businesses lost their windows due to  wind gusts produced within squall lines. In Huntsville, Alabama, a car carrying four people lost control on rain-slicked roads and crashed into a van, killing one of the occupants and injuring the other three. Another fatality occurred in Kentucky when a utility worker was knocked over by high winds and fell  to his death while trying to restore power. Following the widespread power outages from a severe ice storm, an additional 161,588 residences lost power due to  winds. Flooding and high winds in Michigan knocked out power to about 57,000 residences. In Tennessee, several structures were damaged and numerous trees were knocked down, closing roads throughout the state as the squall line tracked eastward. A total of 74,052 residences lost power due to the winds. Winds gusting up to  caused substantial damage in Rutherford County. Several commercial buildings had major roof damage, leaving $150,000 in damages. Throughout Tennessee, damages from the storm system were estimated at $1.1 million.

Iowa, Illinois, Indiana and Virginia
In Iowa, heavy rains triggered rapid snowmelt, causing isolated flooding. Only minor impacts resulted from the flooding and total damages from the event was estimated at $25,000. A total of 14,590 residences lost power in Indiana. Several large trees were brought down by high winds, one of which fell on a home in South Bend, leaving $50,000 in damages. The heavy rains, in combination with unseasonably warm temperatures, led to significant snowmelt and flooding. A total of 70,695 residences lost power in Illinois. Rainfall up to  fell throughout most of the state. Several major roadways were covered in flood waters. The Little Wabash River overflowed its banks and inundated nearby roads. Along IL 1, a large tree blocked a section of the road near Georgetown. The fallen tree resulted in a vehicle accident but the driver was unharmed. One person was killed by high winds in Davy, West Virginia when a gymnasium roof collapsed. Throughout the state, power was knocked out to an estimated 225,000 residences. Winds up to  cut power to 28,059 residences in the state. The strong winds also cut power to 50,820 residences in Maryland.

Western Pennsylvania and Chesapeake watershed 
Hurricane-force wind gusts up to  caused significant damage and power losses in Pennsylvania. Throughout the state, at least 400,000 residences lost power due to the winds. Allegheny Power stated that the loss of power due to this system was the largest ever experienced by the company. Thousands of trees and power lines were brought down by strong winds and numerous homes sustained significant damage. Although most of the damage to homes consisted of shingle damage, several homes lost gutters and had portions of their siding blown off.

In Pottstown, a large portion of the roof of a four-story building was blown off, forcing residents to evacuate the building. An  pillar was knocked down at the First Moravian Church in Easton. In Northampton County, a fire sparked by fallen power lines destroyed a barn and partially melted a nearby metal shed. The blaze was fully contained by 40 firefighters. Another fire sparked by fallen power lines destroyed a garage in Lower Merion Township. In Philadelphia, the roof of a portable classroom began to peel off, forcing the forty students inside to evacuate to a safer structure. A large tree fell through one house and severely damaged the roof of a nearby home. Numerous major highways and local streets were shut down for several hours to allow cleanup crews to clear debris. Throughout the state, damages from the storm system amounted to $3.7 million.

New York
In upstate New York, winds in excess of  shattered windows, toppled numerous trees, and brought down power lines, cutting power to more than 50,000 residences. Unseasonably warm temperatures and heavy rains from the storm system increased the snowmelt rate in northern areas of the state. In Genesee County, an estimated  of the snowpack melted, triggering flash floods along several rivers. Several homes were inundated by flood waters throughout the region. In all, 84,624 residences lost power in New York State. The storm system continued producing gusty winds through February 12, which caused tree damage and power outages, and killed a construction worker in the New York City metropolitan area. The construction worker was killed after a cinder block wall collapsed due to high-winds. Throughout Long Island, an estimated 4,000 people lost power.

New Jersey, Connecticut and Massachusetts
A total of 93,816 residences were also left without power at the height of the storm. A total of 8,486 Connecticut residences were left without power and one boy was injured after high winds damaged numerous power lines and tree limbs. In Massachusetts, gusts up to  brought down several trees and cut power to residences in Middleborough, Boston, Brookline and Hingham. The Western Massachusetts Electric Company reported that at least 360 residences lost power during the storm.

Aftermath

In the wake of the tornado outbreak law enforcement officers, including 30 national guard troops, were sent to Lone Grove to provide security. The American Red Cross opened shelters in Ardmore, Edmond, and Oklahoma City. About 100 volunteers from the Sorghum Mill Estates Neighborhood Association traveled to affected areas in Edmond to help with cleanup efforts. A local restaurant provided free meals to the volunteers as they assisted relief workers. The Salvation Army had two canteens in Oklahoma City, one in Lone Grove, and one in Perkins. About 2,000 meals, drinks, and snacks were provided by the Salvation Army to emergency responders. Feed the Children sent two truckloads of relief supplies to Carter County. They also sent three food trucks, containing a total of 619 meals, 900 drinks, and about 500 snacks, to Ardmore. On February 22, the New Life Baptist Church sent drinks and prepackaged snacks, along with items needed for clean-up. Baptist Disaster Relief assisted in Lone Grove with food and emotional care. The Oklahoma City Thunder of the National Basketball Association (NBA) gave away two tickets to anyone who made a donation of $25 or an equivalent amount of food to benefit victims of the tornado. A concert featuring Chris Cagle and other local musicians at Heritage Hall in Ardmore raised over $18,000 to benefit Carter County tornado victims. Another concert set up by the Salvation Army raised $2,300 more for victims.

The Governor of Oklahoma Brad Henry declared a State of Emergency in 17 counties and described the outbreak as the worst natural disaster he had seen since becoming governor. On February 15, President Obama approved Henry's request for federal assistance in Carter, Logan and Oklahoma counties. A disaster recovery center was set up by the Federal Emergency Management Agency (FEMA) on February 20. Homeowners were allowed to borrow $200,000 to repair damages to their home or find a temporary or permanent shelter. They were also allowed to borrow up to $40,000 to replace lost property. Businesses were allowed to borrow up to $2 million for damage repair, property loss, and economic loss. By February 23, about $781,000 had been given in federal grants. On February 25, FEMA approved Governor Henry's request for public assistance in Carter, Coal and Love counties. The estimated cost to clear the 7,000 tons of debris in Lone Grove was placed at $500,000, of which $90,000 has been paid for by FEMA. The Department of Homeland Security offered to assist with the reconstruction of homes and businesses and to support those who were left homeless. President Barack Obama passed along his condolences and best wishes to the victims of the tornado.

See also
List of North American tornadoes and tornado outbreaks
List of F4 and EF4 tornadoes
List of United States tornadoes from January to March 2009

Notes

References

Tornadoes of 2009
Tornadoes in Oklahoma
2009 natural disasters in the United States
F4 tornadoes by date
Tornadoes in Texas
Tornadoes in Missouri
Tornadoes in Tennessee
Tornadoes in Indiana
Tornadoes in Virginia
Tornado outbreak